Zemenfes Solomon (born 17 March 1997) is an Eritrean cyclist.

Palmares
2015
1st  Junior National Time Trial Championships
2016
3rd Overall Tour du Faso
1st Stages 2, 3,5 & 9 
1st  Points Classification
2017
2nd Fenkil Northern Red Sea Challenge

References

1997 births
Living people
Eritrean male cyclists